Skin is a studio album by Australian musician Katie Noonan. It was released in August 2007 and peaked at number 6 on the Australian ARIA Charts.
Skin was the first album released by Noonan as a solo artist and recorded between the time of 3 and 8 months pregnant.
Noonan says: "I love the themes I explored on this album – I was a madly in love newlywed, experiencing the miracle of pregnancy – it was quite a trip to document! Inspired by Donny Hathaway, Aretha Franklin, Stevie Wonder and Vince Jones, this album was all about exploring groove for me. I learn’t a huge amount making this album and I am really grateful for the arduous journey I took with this process, as since then, it has confirmed my instinct to listen to and trust my inner voice."

Reviews
Bernard Zuel from Sydney Morning Herald said "Her first solo album finds her mostly dabbling in a kind of fluttering, '70s soul jazz reminiscent of, among others, Minnie Riperton." adding "The songs have a basement soul feel. That is, as with any number of competent jazz funk bands you may see at the Sydney venue on a Friday night, there's a groove, but apart from "Return", it never sinks in beneath the skin. Across them Noonan's lyrics are not awful but they rarely say something that couldn't have been done by a committee."

Track listing
 "Logic" - 2:47
 "Return" - 3:32
 "Time to Begin" - 4:25
 "Love's My Song for You" - 4:06
 "Little Boy Man" - 3:22
 "Sunshine" - 3:31
 "One Step" - 3:48
 "Home"	- 4:19
 "Send Out a Little Love" - 3:51
 "Who Are You?" - 4:30
 "Bluebird" - 4:43
 "A Little Smile" - 3:05

Bonus disc
 "Special Ones"
 "Crazy"
 "I Think I Am"
 "Choir Girl"
 "Breathe In Now"

Charts

Weekly charts

Year-end charts

External links
 "Skin" by Katie Noonan at Discogs

References

2007 albums
Katie Noonan albums
Festival Records albums
Mushroom Records albums
Pop albums by Australian artists